Delta Spirit is the self-titled third studio album by the band Delta Spirit. The album was released on March 12, 2012 through Rounder Records.

It charted on the Billboard 200, reaching #1 on the Heatseekers chart, #12 on the Tastemakers chart and #15 on the Alternative Albums chart.

It spawned the single "California", which garnered significant radio airplay in the band's hometown of San Diego.

Track listing 
"Empty House" - 3:56
"Tear It Up" - 3:24
"California" - 3:41
"Idaho" - 3:28
"Home" - 4:08
"Otherside" - 4:08
"Tellin' the Mind" - 2:47
"Time Bomb" - 4:21
"Into the Darkness" - 4:36
"Money Saves" - 4:25
"Yamaha" - 4:24

Personnel
Matthew Vasquez - vocals, guitars
Kelly Winrich - keys, programming, guitars, percussion, lapsteel, dronebox, bg's
William Mclaren - guitars, bg's
Johnathan Jameson - bass, bg's
Brandon Young - drums, percussion, bg's

Charts

References

2012 albums
Delta Spirit albums
Rounder Records albums
Albums produced by Chris Coady